Charles Lincoln Hall (February 16, 1887 – January 17, 1972) was an American long-distance runner. He competed in the men's 5 miles at the 1908 Summer Olympics.

References

External links
 

1887 births
1972 deaths
Athletes (track and field) at the 1908 Summer Olympics
American male long-distance runners
Olympic track and field athletes of the United States
Place of birth missing
20th-century American people